Hopkins Covered Bridge Farm is a historic home and farm located near Lewes, Sussex County, Delaware. The house was built about 1868, and is a rectangular, two-story, five bay, single-pile, center-hall passage, frame dwelling with vernacular Gothic style details.  It has a rectangular, two-story, three-bay, single pile, center passage, frame ell or wing.  Both sections have gable roofs.  The front facade has a three-bay, hipped roof porch.  Also on the property are a contributing dairy barn designed by Rodney O'Neil (1925, 1936), milk house (1925), and silo (c. 1938–1939).

It was added to the National Register of Historic Places in 1991.

References

Farms on the National Register of Historic Places in Delaware
Houses completed in 1868
Houses in Lewes, Delaware
National Register of Historic Places in Sussex County, Delaware